The RZA Presents: Afro Samurai Resurrection The Soundtrack is the soundtrack to 2009 anime television film Afro Samurai: Resurrection. It was released on January 27, 2009, via Wu Music Group/Koch Records, serving as a sequel to RZA's 2007 Afro Samurai The Soundtrack. Recording sessions mostly took place at 36 West in North Hollywood. Produced entirely by RZA, the album features contributions from Kool G Rap, Rah Digga, Shavo Odadjian, Sly Stone, and Wu-Tang Clan members and affiliates.

Track listing

References

External links 

 Afro Samurai Website

RZA albums
Sequel albums
2009 soundtrack albums
Hip hop soundtracks
E1 Music soundtracks
Albums produced by RZA
Wu Music Group soundtracks
Television animation soundtracks